Zhou Can (born 20 May 1979) is a Chinese long jumper. His personal best jump is 8.22 metres, achieved in June 2007 in Suzhou.

He won the silver medal at the 2003 Asian Championships and the bronze medal at the 2005 Asian Championships. He also competed at the 2004 World Indoor Championships, the 2004 Olympic Games and the 2008 Olympic Games without reaching the final round.

Achievements

References

1979 births
Living people
Chinese male long jumpers
Athletes (track and field) at the 2004 Summer Olympics
Athletes (track and field) at the 2008 Summer Olympics
Olympic athletes of China
21st-century Chinese people